Paryeongsan is a mountain of Jeollanam-do, southwestern South Korea.

See also
 List of mountains of Korea

References

Goheung County
mountains of South Jeolla Province
Sobaek Mountains